Oleg Valeryevich Polyakov (born 29 November 1990) is a Russian professional football player who plays for Armenian club FC Urartu.

Club career
Polyakov made his Russian Football National League debut for FC Dynamo Bryansk on 20 March 2012 in a game against FC Torpedo Moscow.

On 14 July 2020, Polyakov signed for FC Urartu.

References

External links
 

1990 births
People from Kamyshin
Living people
Russian footballers
Association football forwards
Association football midfielders
FC Energiya Volzhsky players
FC Sokol Saratov players
FC Tyumen players
FC Torpedo Moscow players
FC KAMAZ Naberezhnye Chelny players
FC Armavir players
FC Dynamo Bryansk players
FC Zenit-Izhevsk players
FC Urartu players
Russian First League players
Russian Second League players
Armenian Premier League players
Russian expatriate footballers
Expatriate footballers in Armenia
Sportspeople from Volgograd Oblast